Seille may refer to several rivers in France:

Seille (Moselle), in Lorraine, tributary of the Moselle
Seille (Saône), in Franche-Comté and Burgundy, tributary of the Saône
Seille (Ouvèze), in Provence, tributary of the Ouvèze

See also
Seilles, a village in the Belgian municipality Andenne